Intuit: The Center for Intuitive and Outsider Art, also known as the Intuit Art Center or just Intuit, is a museum in the West Town neighborhood of Chicago dedicated to outsider art. Founded in 1991, the museum offers exhibitions and educational programming exploring contemporary self-taught art.

History

A group of Chicago art enthusiasts, including Susann Craig, Robert A. Roth, and Marjorie and Harvey Freed, founded Intuit in June 1991. In 1995 the museum gained a physical space in the Roger Brown Home and Studio at 1926 North Halsted Street in the Lincoln Park neighborhood. The museum moved to a larger space in 1999, an 1874 brick building at 756 North Milwaukee Avenue which was formerly the location of the Randolph Street Gallery. An expansion in 2006 provided more exhibition space and the Robert A. Roth Study Center.

Collection
Intuit is one of the few museums in the world that exclusively shows outsider art. The permanent collection includes artists such as William Hawkins, William Dawson, Minnie Evans, Howard Finster, Wesley Willis, Lee Godie, Mr. Imagination, and Joseph Yoakum. Like many outsider artists, the artists represented in Intuit's collections have often faced significant life challenges, such as mental illness or institutionalization.

The museum took ownership of the contents of Henry Darger's apartment in 2000, and in 2008 opened a permanent exhibit recreating the artist's living and working space.

Programming
Intuit has created multiple social outreach programs, coordinating with schools, libraries, and other organizations to promote arts in education. IntuiTeens is an annual summer program where teenagers collaborate with teen mentors, professional artists, and community organizations to develop their art skills. The Teacher Fellowship Program provides teachers at Chicago Public Schools with the skills to introduce their students to non-traditional materials and methods. Intuit programs have also included workshops for people with dementia, low vision and blindness, and developmental disabilities.

The museum has also hosted an Intuit Show of Folk and Outsider Art and publishes an annual magazine, The Outsider.

See also

 List of museums and cultural institutions in Chicago
 Visual arts of Chicago

References

External links
 official website
 YouTube channel
 A Virtual Tour Inside Chicago's Center for Outsider Art 3-minute video from WTTW (2020)

1991 establishments in Illinois
Art museums and galleries in Chicago
Art museums and galleries in Illinois
Art museums established in 1991
Folk art museums and galleries in Illinois
Museums of American art
Outsider art
Tourist attractions in Chicago